Johnston County is the name of two counties in the United States:

 Johnston County, North Carolina 
 Johnston County, Oklahoma

See also
Johnson County (disambiguation)